Sydney Cyril Bulley (12 June 1907 – 20 November 1989) was an English bishop.

He was born on 12 June 1907 and educated at the University of Durham. He was a member of St Chad's College. He began his ministry as a curate at Newark and was then successively vicar of Worksop (1942), Rural Dean of Mansfield (1946), Director of Religious Education in the Diocese of Carlisle and Archdeacon of Westmorland and Furness (c.1950) before his ordination to the episcopate, initially as the Suffragan Bishop of Penrith (1959–1966) and then as Bishop of Carlisle (1966–1972). In 1972 he was an awarded an honorary doctorate by Durham.

A noted author, his works included the autobiographical “The Glass of Time”, published in 1981, “Faith, Fire and Fun”, 1985 and  “Glimpses of the Divine”, 1987 He was also a Cumbrian enthusiast. He retired in 1972 and died on 20 November 1989.

References

1907 births
Alumni of St Chad's College, Durham
Archdeacons of Westmorland and Furness
Bishops of Penrith
Bishops of Carlisle
20th-century Church of England bishops
1989 deaths
Honorary Chaplains to the Queen